Vernon Louis "Lefty" Gomez (November 26, 1908 – February 17, 1989) was an American professional baseball player. A left-handed pitcher, Gomez played in Major League Baseball (MLB) between 1930 and 1943 for the New York Yankees and the Washington Senators. Gomez was a five-time World Series champion with the Yankees. He was also known for his colorful personality and humor throughout his career and life.

Gomez grew up in California and played for the San Francisco Seals after high school. He made his MLB debut with the Yankees in April 1930. He was selected as an All-Star every year between 1933 and 1939. He sustained an arm injury in 1940. Though he rebounded well in 1941, he pitched his last full season in 1942, then appeared in one game in 1943 before retiring with the Washington Senators.

In 1933, Gomez married June O'Dea, who had a brief career as a Broadway actress. After his retirement, he became a popular public speaker. Gomez was elected to the National Baseball Hall of Fame by the Veterans Committee in 1972. He made an appearance at Yankee Stadium in 1987, when he and Whitey Ford were honored with plaques at the stadium's Monument Park. He died in California in 1989.

Early life
Gomez was born in Rodeo, California. His father, Francisco Gomez, had been born in California to a Spanish father, Juan Gomez, and a Portuguese mother, Rita. His mother, Lizzie Herring, was an American of Welsh-Irish descent. He was the youngest out of eight children in his family. His father grew up as a cowboy and was known as “Coyote” most of his life. He managed a 1,000-acre ranch in Franklin Canyon where Lefty and his brothers would ride horses and became hired hands when they were children. They would wake up as early as 4:00 am to milk the cows and clean out the stalls before they headed to school for the day. When he was 6 years old he attended the San Francisco World's Fair and watched the famous pilot Lincoln Beachy crash into the bay while trying to complete a stunt. He was very outgoing and liked to try many different hobbies out. When he was 8 years old, he attended a 4th of July parade where he found a new passion to play the saxophone. His brother Earl was a big help in this passion and purchased Lefty his first saxophone on his ninth birthday. Lefty took a job plucking chickens at the local butcher shop to earn money for lessons. 

Gomez started playing sandlot baseball for the Rodeo town team when he was only 13 years of age. He excelled right off the bat at the age of 14 and pitched throughout central California. He caught the eyes of a scout for the San Francisco Seals, who told Lefty to reach back out when he put on some weight as he was  but only . He then got a summer job at a union oil scraping sludge from the stills at the refinery. He attended Richmond high school because his local school did not have a baseball team. In his senior year of high school, he was offered a scholarship to play baseball at St. Mary's College, a smaller school that was just east of Oakland. However, his father told him to give up baseball and focus on schoolwork to become an engineer like his older brother Milfred.

Baseball career 
The New York Yankees purchased Gomez from the Seals for an estimated $39,000. 

A memorial plaque dedicated to Lefty Gomez at the Lefty Gomez Field in Rodeo along with a cement impression of his left hand dated 11/22/1932 can be seen at 470 Parker Ave, Rodeo, CA 94572.

Career

Although his father was not a fan of continuing baseball, he went ahead and signed the contract for Lefty to play for the Seals at the 1928 spring training camp. He was not off to a hot start but picked up quit and was sent to the Utah- Idaho League for the season. At 21 years old, he was finally a Yankee. He reported in at 6 feet 2 inches and weighing in at 147 pounds. This scared many people that he was not ready for the big leagues. Gomez made his major league debut on April 29, 1930. He pitched in only 15 games and finished the season with a 2–5 win–loss record, a 5.55 earned run average (ERA). Following a common medical strategy of the time, the team had most of his teeth extracted; they also had him drink three quarts of milk daily and gave him an unlimited meal allowance for road games. Gomez registered the second-best ERA in the American League in 1931.

A 20-game winner four times and an All-Star every year from 1933 to 1939, Gomez led the league twice each in wins, winning percentage and ERA; he was a three-time league leader in shutouts and strikeouts. In the first major league All-Star Game (July 6, 1933), Gomez was the winning pitcher for the American League (AL) and drove in the first run of the game. This was out of character for him; he was notorious for poor hitting even by AL standards. Late in life, Gomez commented, "I never even broke a bat until last year when I was backing out of the garage." His career OPS+ of -7 is the fifth-worst in baseball history among players with at least 1,000 plate appearances. Gomez holds the record for the most innings pitched in a single All-Star game (six, in 1934).

Lefty's best season came in 1934, when he won 26 games and lost just five. In both 1934 and 1937, he won pitching's "Triple Crown" by leading the league in wins, ERA and strikeouts; he also led the AL both seasons in shutouts. His .649 career winning percentage ranks 15th in major league history among pitchers with 200 or more decisions. Among pitchers who made their MLB debuts from 1900 to 1950, only Lefty Grove, Christy Mathewson and Whitey Ford have both more victories and a higher winning percentage than Gomez.

Gomez won six World Series games without a loss.  As of 2021, this is a postseason record as well as a World Series record. He won a World Series game in 1932, two in 1936, two in 1937 and one in 1938. He also set a World Series record by receiving two walks in the same inning on October 6, 1937.

Nicknamed "El Goofo" and "Goofy Gomez", he was known for his sense of humor, even on the field. In one game, he came up to bat when it was slightly foggy. Bob Feller was on the mound and Gomez struck a match before stepping into the batter's box. "What's the big idea?" asked the umpire. "Do you think that match will help you see Feller's fast one?" Gomez replied, "No, I'm not concerned about that. I just want to make sure he can see me!" Another time, a reporter asked the noted brushback pitcher, "Is it true that you'd throw at your own mother?" Gomez replied, "You're damn right I would. She's a good hitter." Gomez also often remarked, "I'd rather be lucky than good."

In 1940, Gomez suffered an arm injury, which left him up for grabs by another team, but in 1941 he played fairly well, winning 15 and losing 5. During that season, he was said to be a great starting pitcher, but won through the support of Johnny Murphy, who relieved him in later innings. After the 1942 season ended, Gomez took a job as a dispatcher with the General Electric River Works, a defense plant in Lynn, Massachusetts, which only paid $40 a week. Then on January 27, 1943, the Yankees sold him to the Boston Braves for $10,000 ($ in current dollar terms).

Gomez never appeared in a game with the Braves, as later in the year he was released from his contract and signed with the Washington Senators. He pitched just one game ― on May 30, 1943, allowing four hits, four runs and walking five men ― before pulling a shoulder muscle in the fifth inning and retiring from baseball. He had a 189–102 career record with 1,468 strikeouts and a 3.34 ERA in 2,503 innings pitched.

Marriage
On February 26, 1933, Gomez married June O’Dea (1912–1992). A Broadway headliner who starred in Of Thee I Sing, she gave up her career in 1936. By 1937 the marriage was on shaky ground. Gomez traveled to Hollywood that April and June returned to Massachusetts to stay with family. Through the tabloids, she learned in December that Gomez was filing divorce papers in Mexico, charging incompatibility. Being a devout Catholic, June refused a divorce but agreed to a formal separation, citing abandonment and cruel and inhuman treatment. Publicly, Gomez said the whole idea of divorce was absurd, but after the first of the year he moved to Reno to get a six-week divorce. It was his intention for the divorce to be finalized by the time he began spring training in Florida. Separation proceedings continued for months, but were called off in May 1938. Gomez and O'Dea had two daughters and two sons.

After baseball
In retirement, Gomez became a sought-after dinner speaker known for his humorous anecdotes about his playing days and the personalities he knew. He was a bit of a screwball, nicknamed "El Goofo" or "Goofy Gomez" (a likewise-alliterative counterpart to his contemporary, Dizzy Dean), and delighted in playing practical jokes on everyone from teammates to umpires. On February 2, 1972, the Veterans Committee unanimously inducted Gomez into the National Baseball Hall of Fame, along with Giants outfielder Ross Youngs and former American League President Will Harridge. The Committee noted that Lefty pitched in seven World Series games with no losses and five wins. Wearing a Yankee cap, Gomez became the second player of Hispanic descent to be inducted.

The 1983 Major League Baseball All-Star Game was dedicated to Gomez as he was the last surviving player from the 1933 All-Star Game. He also threw out the ceremonial first pitch. On August 2, 1987, he and Whitey Ford were honored with plaques to be placed in Monument Park at Yankee Stadium. Gomez's plaque says he was "Noted for his wit and his fastball, as he was fast with a quip and a pitch." Despite advancing age, he was able to attend the ceremony. Although he was honored with the plaque, his uniform #11 has not been retired, and has since been worn by several Yankees including Joe Page, Johnny Sain, Héctor López, Fred Stanley, Dwight Gooden, Chuck Knoblauch, Gary Sheffield, Doug Mientkiewicz, and Brett Gardner.

Gomez spent the last years of his life in Novato, California; he died of congestive heart failure on February 17, 1989, in Marin General Hospital in Larkspur, California. A decade later, he was ranked #73 on The Sporting News list of the 100 Greatest Baseball Players, and was a nominee for the Major League Baseball All-Century Team.

Hall of Fame 
There has been some controversy on who makes it into the Hall of Fame. There are pitchers that make it to the Hall of Fame because they are good pitchers, and others make it because they are good pitchers who have pitched for a long time. Lefty Gomez was a great pitcher when he pitched. He did not pitch for a very long time. He had only pitched for 11 seasons. Andy Pettitte had been a great pitcher but pitched 5 more seasons than Gomez did. For that reason, he may be inducted into the Hall of Fame due to the amount of time that he pitched. They played in different eras but had very similar career stats. Gomez had a four-time 20 game season, while Pettitte did that twice. Pettitte had a 3.88 career ERA and Gomez 3.34 career ERA. As far as the World Series, Gomez appeared in 5 while Pettit appeared in 8. As for as dominance goes, Lefty Gomez has taken control of that. He is perfect in the World Series as he went 6-0 with a 2.86 ERA in the span of those games. In the span of all of this, Gomez faced some tough hitters throughout the way. This does not take anything away from Andy Pettitte. Gomez was a great pitcher and a fairly consistent one for the Yankees during his time with them. Jimmy Foxx said that Gomez was one of the only batters he faced and almost never got him out. Jimmy Fox ended his career with 2,646 hits from in 20-year seasons ranging from 1925-1945 with 515 home runs with a career batting average of .325. A quote directly from lefty states, " I don't wanna throw him nothin', maybe he will get tired of waiting and leave. "This is an outstanding player and just an example of what kind of players he was pitching to during his career. When Inducted to the Hall of Fame in 1972, he was asked to say some words and he says, " The thing that helped me succeed was clean living, a fast outfield, and Johny Murphy." Murphy was a top relief pitcher for the Yankees who helped saved games for Gomez.

Legacy 
He is remembered as such a great left-handed pitcher that did it in a time where baseball was starting to be Americas game. He touched the lives of many for his fun a goofy personality. He is remembered to this day and there is an award named ABCA(American Baseball Coaches Association)/Wilson Lefty Gomez Award. This is an award of one of the most of all amateur baseball. Each year, this award is given to an individual that has distinguished himself and has contributed a significant amount to his team and the game. This can be either as a coach, or a player. The first time this award was given was 1962, all the way to 2023. Lefty Gomez was so impactful, there are many different awards that he has received as well as awards that are named in his memory.

These awards are the following:

 The Lefty Gomez Volunteer of the year award
 The Lefty Gomez Softball Volunteer of the year award

Baseball Field Dedications: 

 Lefty Gomez Ballpark (Fairfax, California)
 Lefty Gomez Field (Rodeo, California)
 Lefty Gomez Varsity Baseball Field (San Marin, California)

National Honors

 United States Goodwill Ambassador 1958
 Congressional Record Commemoration 1976
 Good Guy Award 1976
 Lou Gehrig Pride of The Yankees Award 1987

Baseball Honors

 MLB World Series Champion Team:1932, 1936, 1937, 1938, 1939, 1941
 MLB All- Star Team: 1933, 1934, 1935, 1936, 1937, 1938, 1939
 Triple Crown of Pitching: 1934, 1937
 AL Pitching Champion: 1934, 1937
 Elected to All- American All Stars and Japan Goodwill Tour: 1934
 Director, Babe Ruth Baseball League International: 1964-1989
 Annual National All-Star Promotion Tour: 1969-1985
 Honorary Co-Captain of the MLB 50th All-Star Game: 1979
 Honorary 50th Anniversary All-Star Game Pitcher: 1983
 Smithsonian Museum Guest of Honor: 1984
 King Of Baseball: 1986

See also

 List of Major League Baseball annual ERA leaders
 Major League Baseball Triple Crown
 List of Major League Baseball annual strikeout leaders
 List of Major League Baseball annual wins leaders
 Major League Baseball titles leaders
 Bay Area Sports Hall of Fame

Footnotes

Further reading

External links
 

, or Retrosheet
 Interview with Lefty Gomez conducted by Eugene Murdock, June 3, 1982, in Williamstown, West Virginia (90 minutes)
 

National Baseball Hall of Fame inductees
American League All-Stars
American League ERA champions
American League strikeout champions
American League wins champions
American League Pitching Triple Crown winners
American people of Spanish descent
American people of Portuguese descent
American people of Welsh descent
American people of Irish descent
New York Yankees players
Washington Senators (1901–1960) players
New York Yankees scouts
1908 births
1989 deaths
Minor league baseball managers
Salt Lake City Bees players
San Francisco Seals (baseball) players
St. Paul Saints (AA) players
Binghamton Triplets managers
Binghamton Triplets players
People from Rodeo, California
Dispatchers
People from Novato, California
Richmond High School (Richmond, California) alumni